Osmo is a Finnish male given name. It appears in Kalevala, where it means "a young man". The name has been in use since the 1880s. Name day for Osmo in Finland is 11 May.

People with the name Osmo
Osmo Kontula (born 1951), Finnish sociologist
Osmo Lindeman (1929–1987), Finnish composer
Osmo Pekonen (1960–2022), Finnish mathematician
Osmo Tapio Räihälä (born 1964), Finnish composer
Osmo Soininvaara (born 1951), politician, previous member of the Finnish government
Osmo Vänskä (born 1953), Finnish conductor
Osmo Valtonen (1929–2002), Finnish artist

References

Finnish masculine given names
Masculine given names